Kulhama is a village situated in Tangmarg tehsil of Baramulla district in the Indian union territory of Jammu and Kashmir. The village is located 42 kilometres from the district headquarters Baramulla and 7 kilometres from the tehsil headquarters Tangmarg.

Demographics 
According to the 2011 census of India, Kulhama has a population of 531 people. The literacy rate of Kulhama village was 74.26% compared to 67.16% of Jammu and Kashmir. In Kulhama, Male literacy stands at 82.38% while the female literacy rate is 66.98%.

References 

Jammu and Kashmir
Villages in Baramulla district